The men's sabre competition in fencing at the 2012 Summer Olympics in London was held on 29 July at the ExCeL London Exhibition Centre. There were 37 competitors from 21 nations. Hungary's Áron Szilágyi won the gold medal, beating Diego Occhiuzzi of Italy won took silver. Nikolay Kovalev from Russia won the bronze. Szilágyi's gold medal was Hungary's 13th in the men's sabre.

Background

This was the 27th appearance of the event, which is the only fencing event to have been held at every Summer Olympics. Three of the quarterfinalists from 2008 returned: gold medalist Zhong Man of China, fifth-place finisher Luigi Tarantino of Italy, and eighth-place finisher Aliaksandr Buikevich of Belarus. The favorite was Nicolas Limbach of Germany, the 2009 world champion and runner-up in both 2010 (to South Korea's Won Woo-young) and 2011 (to Italy's Aldo Montano). Other contenders included Won, Montano (who had won Olympic gold in 2004), Zhong, European champion Aleksey Yakimenko of Russia, and South Korea's Gu Bon-gil.

For the first time in the history of the event, no nations made their debut in the men's sabre. Italy made its 25th appearance in the event, most of any nation, having missed the inaugural 1896 event and the 1904 Games.

Qualification

Nations were limited to three fencers each from 1928 to 2004. However, the 2008 Games introduced a rotation of men's team fencing events with one weapon left off each Games; the individual event without a corresponding team event had the number of fencers per nation reduced to two. The men's rotation started with foil (2008) and épée (2012), with sabre scheduled to skip its team event in 2016. Thus, the maximum for individual sabre in 2012 was three per nation.

There were 36 dedicated quota spots for men's sabre. The first 24 spots went to the 3 members of each of the 8 qualified teams in the team foil event. Next, 7 more men were selected from the world rankings based on continents: 2 from Europe, 2 from the Americas, 2 from Asia/Oceania, and 1 from Africa. Finally, 5 spots were allocated by continental qualifying events: 2 from Europe, 1 from the Americas, 1 from Asia/Oceania, and 1 from Africa.

Additionally, there were 8 host/invitational spots that could be spread throughout the various fencing events. Great Britain chose to use 1 of its 8 host places to include a men's sabreur. This made the total number of fencers in the event 37.

Competition format

The sabre competition consisted of a six-round single-elimination bracket with a bronze medal match between the two semifinal losers. Fencing was done to 15 touches or to the completion of three three-minute rounds if neither fencer reached 15 touches by then. At the end of time, the higher-scoring fencer was the winner; a tie resulted in an additional one-minute sudden-death time period. This sudden-death period was further modified by the selection of a draw-winner beforehand; if neither fencer scored a touch during the minute, the predetermined draw-winner won the bout.

Schedule 

All times are British Summer Time (UTC+1)

Results

Section 1

Section 2

Section 3

Section 4

Finals

Final classification

References

Men's sabre
Men's events at the 2012 Summer Olympics